The Healing of Harms is the second full-length studio album released by Christian rock band Fireflight in 2006. The album was Fireflight's first release on Flicker Records. "Waiting", "Liar", and "Serenity" previously appeared on the band's first EP On the Subject of Moving Forward (though "Serenity" was titled "Call").

Track listing

Personnel
 Dawn Richardson – lead vocals
 Justin Cox – guitar, backing vocals
 Wendy Drennen – bass, backing vocals
 Phee Shorb – drums
 Glenn Drennen – guitar

References

Fireflight albums
2006 albums
Flicker Records albums

ja:リライアントK (アルバム)